The 2016 Texas A&M Aggies baseball team represents the Texas A&M University in the 2016 NCAA Division I baseball season. The Aggies play their home games at Olsen Field at Blue Bell Park.

Personnel

Roster

Coaching staff

Schedule and results

† Indicates the game does not count toward the 2016 Southeastern Conference standings.
*Rankings are based on the team's current  ranking in the Collegiate Baseball poll.

Record vs. conference opponents

Rankings

References

Texas AandM
Texas A&M Aggies baseball seasons
Texas AandM